William James Pearse (15 November 1881 – 4 May 1916) was an Irish republican executed for his part in the Easter Rising. He was a younger brother of Patrick Pearse, a leader of the rising.

Background
Willie Pearse was born in Dublin and throughout his life lived in the shadow of his brother to whom he was devoted and with whom he formed a particularly close relationship.

Pearse inherited his father's artistic abilities and became a sculptor. He was educated at the Christian Brothers School, Westland Row. He studied at the Metropolitan School of Art in Dublin under Oliver Sheppard. He also studied art in Paris. While attending the Kensington School of Art in London he gained notice for several of his artworks. Some of his sculptures are to be found in Limerick Cathedral, the Cathedral of St. Eunan and St Columba, Letterkenny and several Dublin churches. He was trained to take over his father's stonemason business, but gave it up to help run St. Enda's School which Patrick had founded in 1908. He was involved in the arts and theatre at St. Enda's, and aided the overall running of the school.

Easter Rising
Pearse followed his brother into the Irish Volunteers and the Republican movement. He took part in the Easter Rising in 1916, always staying by his brother's side at the General Post Office. Following the surrender he was court-martialled and sentenced to death. It has been said that as he was only a minor player in the struggle it was his surname that condemned him. However, at his court martial he emphasised his involvement.

On 3 May, Pearse was granted permission to visit his brother in Kilmainham Gaol, to see him for the final time. However, while Willie was en route, Patrick was executed first. Willie was executed on 4 May. He and his brother were the only two brothers to be executed after the Easter Rising.

Commemoration

There are many more public commemorations of Patrick Pearse than of Willie. In 1966, Dublin's Westland Row railway station was renamed Pearse Station to honour both Willie and Patrick. Pearse Square and Pearse Street, in Dublin, were renamed in honour of both, Pearse Street (then Great Brunswick Street) having been their birthplace. Many streets and roads in Ireland bear the name Pearse; few name Willie, but there is a Pearse Brothers Park in Rathfarnham. The bridge over the Dodder river on the Rathfarnham Road, between Terenure and Rathfarnham is named after them and carries a plaque depicting the brothers in profile.

Brothers Pearse Athletic Club, founded in Rathfarnham, is named after the two brothers.

Willie Pearse Park in Crumlin, opened in 1949, is named after him.

A number of Gaelic Athletic Association clubs and playing fields are named after both Pearses, and at least one after Willie:
 Armagh: Annaghmore Pearses GAC; Pearse Óg GAC and its grounds, Pearse Óg Park, Armagh
 Cork: CLG Na Piarsaigh, Cork 
 Dublin: Willie Pearse Park, the grounds of Crumlin GAA
 Kerry: Dromid Pearses GAC; Kilflynn Pearses HC (defunct)
 Limerick: CLG Na Piarsaigh, Limerick
 Louth: CPG Na Piarsaigh, Dundalk
 Monaghan: Ballybay Pearse Brothers, and its grounds, Pearse Park
 Tyrone: Dregish Pearse Og GAC; Fintona Pearses GAC; and Galbally Pearses GAC
 Wicklow: Pearses' Park, Arklow
 London: Brother Pearse's GAC, London
 Yorkshire: Brothers Pearse GAC, Huddersfield

References

 Ní Ghairbhí, Róisín, Willie Pearse, Dublin: O'Brien Press, 2015.

1881 births
1916 deaths
People from County Dublin
Executed participants in the Easter Rising
Irish revolutionaries
Willie
Irish people of English descent